Rasmus Wremer (born 4 September 1982) is a Swedish handballer. He currently plays for IFK Skövde in the Swedish Elitserien as a left winger.

Wremer has played 11 matches for the Swedish national handball team, scoring 15 goals.

1982 births
Living people
Swedish male handball players
People from Mullsjö Municipality
Sportspeople from Jönköping County